The FAM Women's Football Championship is a Maldivian football competition for women, run by The Football Association of Maldives.

Past winners

Winners table

References

External links
Women's Championship

 
Women
1